The 2002 Budapest mayoral election was held on 20 October 2002 to elect the Mayor of Budapest (főpolgármester). On the same day, local elections were held throughout Hungary, including the districts of Budapest. The election was run using a First-past-the-post voting system. The winner of this election served for 4 years.

The election was won by three-time incumbent, Gábor Demszky.

Results

Notes 
a.

References 

2002 in Hungary
Budapest
Local elections in Hungary
History of Budapest
October 2002 events in Europe